The eighth annual awards were held at the British Academy of Film and Television Arts (BAFTA) on 24 June 1999. The awards were hosted by Moira Stuart.

The overall winner was BBC TV Panorama's "When Good Men Do Nothing", which covered the historical failures which had led to the situation in Rwanda and genocide.

David Bull, Director of Amnesty International UK, said: "Those working to defend human rights depend on the work of journalists whose dedication and determination help to expose injustice, torture and political killings. In a year that has seen continuing gross human rights violations around the world, including the unfolding tragedy of Kosovo, the role of the media in reporting these abuses of basic human rights has never been more vital".

The special award for human rights journalism under threat was awarded to Najam Sethi for his work as editor of the Pakistani national newspaper The Friday Times. He was unable to attend the awards as he had been arrested in Pakistan.

The awards also highlighted the work of Mark Thomas, which was not entered into the competition. Thomas used his series The Mark Thomas Comedy Product to attend Defendory, a trade show for the arms industry. He claimed to be offering PR training to governments and military regimes on how to present a better public image on human rights abuse. His services were sought by the governments of Kenya and Indonesia. Whilst offering these spoof services, Thomas and his assistants filmed Indonesian government officials admitting that the armed forces used torture. The reactions of government departments and arms manufacturers also featured.

Pierre Sané, AI's secretary general, addressed advances in human rights with the establishment of an International Criminal Court to try those responsible for war crimes and crimes against humanity, and in the arrest of General Pinochet. He also pointed to ongoing issues when he said, "But the reports from Kosovo, from the death cells of the USA, and from Sierra Leone also remind us that it has been an appalling year."

The judges for all categories were Andy Blackmore, Romesh Gunesekera, Krishnan Guru-Murthy, Mark Lattimer, Jenni Murray, Geoffrey Robertson QC and Mary Ann Sieghart.

Shortlist and Awards 1999

See also

Notes

References

External links
 Amnesty International UK (AIUK) website
 Amnesty International UK Media Awards at the AIUK Website
 Amnesty International Website

Amnesty International
British journalism awards
Human rights awards
1999 awards in the United Kingdom
June 1999 events in the United Kingdom